Ojjeh is a surname. It is a prominent family originally from Damascus, Syria. Descendants are present in Lebanon, Jordan, Saudi Arabia, the United Kingdom, France, Switzerland, the USA etc. 

Notable people with the surname include:
 Akram Ojjeh (1923–1991), Syrian-born Saudi businessman
 Karim Ojjeh (born 1965), Saudi businessman and racing driver
 Mansour Ojjeh (1952–2021), French Saudi Arabia-born entrepreneur

  

Syrian families